The LXX Army Corps, initially known as Higher Command z. b. V. LXX or Höh.Kdo.70, was an army corps of the German Wehrmacht during World War II. Throughout the war, it was deployed in occupied Norway.

Operational history 

The Höheres Kommando z. b. V. LXX was formed on 4 May 1941 in Schröttersburg and subsequently relocated to Oslo in occupied Norway. There, it was subordinate to Armee Norwegen, which was in turn under direct control of OKW. The initial commander of the corps, called to this task on 16 April 1941, was Valentin Feurstein. Initially, the division consisted of the 69th, 163rd and 214th Infantry Divisions.

The corps command was renamed to Generalkommando LXX. Armeekorps on 25 January 1943. On 22 June 1943, corps commander Valentin Feurstein was replaced by Hermann Tittel.

In December 1944, the LXX Army Corps was moved to the 20th Mountain Army after the dissolution of Armee Norwegen.

At the end of the war, the corps consisted of the 274th and 280th Infantry Divisions and the 613th Special Deployment Division.

Organizational structure

Noteworthy individuals 

 Valentin Feurstein, corps commander between 16 April 1941 and 22 June 1943.
 Hermann Tittel, corps commander between 22 June 1943 and the end of the war.

References 

Corps of Germany in World War II
Military units and formations established in 1941
Military units and formations disestablished in 1945